Polytremis discreta, the Himalayan swift, is a butterfly belonging to the family Hesperiidae.

Distribution
Murree to Sikkim, Assam, Burma, Yunnan

References

Hesperiinae
Butterflies of Asia
Butterflies of Indochina